Narrow-leaved blazingstar is a common name for several plants and may refer to:

Liatris punctata